This is a list of protests and protest movements in the United Kingdom. Protest in the UK has concerned issues such as suffrage in the 19th and early 20th centuries, parliamentary reform from the Chartists to the present day, poverty, wages and working conditions, fuel prices, war, human rights, immigration (both for and against), fathers' rights, LGBTQ rights and climate change. In Northern Ireland, protest marches have been particularly contentious, including Bloody Sunday.

Marches by number

Suffrage and democracy

Chartists
Suffragettes
Women's suffrage in the United Kingdom
Peterloo Massacre
Reform League

Poverty

1920 blind march
Merthyr Rising 1831
Hunger marches, National Hunger March, 1932
Jarrow March
Make Poverty History

Labour disputes

See :Category:Labour disputes in the United Kingdom
1842 General Strike
Welsh coal strike of 1898
Tonypandy Riot
British police strikes in 1918 and 1919
Battle of George Square
1926 United Kingdom general strike
Invergordon Mutiny
Three-Day Week
Grunwick dispute
Winter of Discontent
UK miners' strike (1984–1985)
Battle of Orgreave
Wapping dispute
Liverpool dockers' strike (1995–98)
2002-2003 UK firefighter dispute
Gate Gourmet#Disputes and strike action.
2009 Lindsey Oil Refinery strikes

Rights
1994 Criminal Justice Bill protests
Fathers 4 Justice
Gay Liberation Front
OutRage!
Feminist history in the United Kingdom
1990 Strangeways Prison riot
Gurkha Justice Campaign
2010 UK student protests
George Floyd protests in the United Kingdom
COVID-19 anti-lockdown protests in the United Kingdom

Race and immigration

See also :Category:Race riots in the United Kingdom
Battle of Cable Street
Bristol Bus Boycott, 1963
Battle of Lewisham
Anti-Nazi League
Rock Against Racism
Unite Against Fascism
Anti-Fascist Action
Blair Peach
Kevin Gately
George Floyd protests in the United Kingdom

Taxation

Poll Tax Riots
UK fuel protests
Rebecca Riots
Poplar Rates Rebellion
UK Uncut

Environment

Campaign against Climate Change
Road protest in the United Kingdom
List of road protests in the UK and Ireland
Twyford Down
Newbury bypass
Camp for Climate Action
Reclaim The Streets
Swampy
Plane Stupid
Stop Esso campaign
Frack Off
Extinction Rebellion
Insulate Britain
Just Stop Oil
Bristol Youth Strike 4 Climate
Extinction Rebellion Youth

Animal rights
Hunt sabotage
Countryside Alliance's Liberty & Livelihood March in September 2002, with 400,000 marchers.
2004 invasion of Parliament by pro-hunting protesters
Stop Huntingdon Animal Cruelty
Pro-Test

War

Anti-Vietnam War Grosvenor Square riot
Protests of 1968
Conscientious objectors
Stop the War Coalition
Brian Haw
Protest against the Iraq War in London, 15 February 2003
Protests against the War in Afghanistan (2001–2021)
'UK with Ukraine', March 2022 march and protest against Russia's invasion of Ukraine attracted 150,000 people

Nuclear
Committee of 100 (United Kingdom)
Campaign for Nuclear Disarmament
Greenham Common Women's Peace Camp
Faslane Peace Camp

Religion

Islamist demonstration outside Danish Embassy in London in 2006
Jenny Geddes
Prayer Book Rebellion
Pilgrimage of Grace
Protests against Jerry Springer: The Opera
The Satanic Verses controversy

Art and culture

Stuckist demonstrations
State Britain
British protest songs
Mark McGowan
K Foundation

Foreign policy

Israel lobby in the United Kingdom
2009 Tamil diaspora protests
2008 Olympic torch relay protests
2008 Pro-Tibetan protests
2008-2009 Gaza War protests
Global Day of Action for Burma

Anti-capitalist/anti-globalisation

2009 G-20 London summit protests
Carnival Against Capitalism
2005 G8 protests in Gleneagles
Stop the City
May Day protests since 2000
Occupy movement in the United Kingdom

Troubles in Northern Ireland

Northern Ireland Civil Rights Association
1969 Northern Ireland Riots
Battle of the Bogside
Parades in Northern Ireland
Drumcree conflict
Bloody Sunday
Blanket protest
Dirty protest
1981 Irish hunger strike
Ulster Says No

Other
Bedroom Tax protests (2013-?)
Red Clydeside
Luddites
Swing Riots
Radical War
Tolpuddle Martyrs
Temperance movement
Skeleton Army
"Put It To The People" anti-Brexit march (2019)

Laws governing protest

Article 11 of the European Convention on Human Rights
Serious Organised Crime and Police Act 2005, or SOCPA
Public Order Act 1936
Public Order Act 1963
Public Order Act 1986
Criminal Justice and Public Order Act 1994
Blasphemy law in the United Kingdom
Racial and Religious Hatred Act 2006
Section 44 of the Terrorism Act 2000 - Wide-ranging stop and search
Terrorism Act 2006
 Section 76 of the Counter-Terrorism Act 2008 - prohibiting photography of the police at certain times.
Trade Union and Labour Relations (Consolidation) Act 1992
Sedition#United Kingdom
Police, Crime, Sentencing and Courts Bill

Policing

Police stop, search, detention and arrest powers in the United Kingdom
Territorial Support Group
Special Patrol Group
Forward Intelligence Team
Kettling
National Public Order Intelligence Unit
National Extremism Tactical Co-ordination Unit

Protest organisations
London Action Resource Centre
SchNEWS
People's Assembly Against Austerity
Extinction Rebellion
Black Lives Matter

Protest websites
Urban75
Indymedia and Bristol Indymedia

See also
Civil liberties in the United Kingdom
History of radicalism in the United Kingdom
Lobbying in the United Kingdom
:Category:Political advocacy groups in the United Kingdom
Speakers' Corner
:Category:Riots and civil disorder in the United Kingdom
Renouncing a British honour
Student activism in the UK
:Category:Rebellions in the United Kingdom and Ireland
:Category:British activists

References

Further reading

External links

Scottish Parliament e-petitions

 
United Kingdom politics-related lists
United Kingdom
United Kingdom history-related lists
Lists of events in the United Kingdom